Agadir – Al Massira Airport is an international airport serving Agadir, a major city in southwest Morocco and the capital of Souss-Massa region. The airport is located in the commune of Temsia, 20 km southeast of Agadir proper. In 2007, Al Massira International Airport served 1,502,094 passengers. In later years, Agadir and its tourism boomed, having new flights introduced to Al Massira from new airports from the United Kingdom and Ireland.

Facilities

Runway and apron
The runway in direction 09/27 measures . Aircraft up to the size of a Boeing 747 can land on the airport. The airport has an ILS Class II certification and offers the following radionavigational aids: VOR – DME – 2 X NDB.

Terminal
There is one large waiting room, divided in two to provide for national flights (no customs) and international flights. Passengers flying to Casablanca with a connecting international flight can pass through passport control in Agadir to save transfer time at Mohammed V. Agadir is one of the six airports in Morocco where ONDA offers its special VIP service Salon Convives de Marque.

Airlines and destinations
The following airlines operate regular scheduled and charter flights at Agadir–Al Massira Airport:

 This flight operates via Marrakech. However, this carrier does not have rights to transport passengers solely between Agadir and Marrakech.

Traffic statistics
ONDA reported the following statistics regarding Al Massira Airport.

Accidents and incidents
On 21 August 1994, Royal Air Maroc Flight 630, crashed approximately ten minutes after take-off from Agadir Airport. All 44 passengers and crew on board were killed. The crash is believed to have been a deliberate act by the aircraft's pilot.

References

External links

 
 
 

Airports in Morocco
Airport, Al Massira
Buildings and structures in Souss-Massa